The Order for Loyalty and Merit is a house order of the Dutch Royal House of Orange-Nassau. The Order came into being as a result of Queen Juliana's reorganization of The House Order of Orange (Huisorde van Oranje) in 1969.

The Order for Loyalty and Merit is conferred "upon those persons who have loyally and faithfully, and with merit and character assisted the Head of State or the members of the Royal House during their obligations and their daily work."

The order has two grades:

Cross for Loyalty and Merit in Gold;
Cross for Loyalty and Merit in Silver.

The cross in gold or silver is worn on a ribbon on the left chest. The decorations are awarded after 25 and 40 years of service.
The monarch is lenient as far as the number of years in his service are concerned. Hardly anyone manages to work until his or her 65th birthday. Many servants of the King receive their Cross of merit for Loyalty and Merit in Gold after 35 years in the Royal Household.

References

External links
  (Dutch)

Loyalty and Merit, Order for